Mercer County is a county in the Commonwealth of Pennsylvania. As of the 2020 census, the population was 110,652. Its county seat is Mercer, and its largest city is Hermitage. The county was created in 1800 and later organized in 1803.

Mercer County is included in the Youngstown-Warren-Boardman, OH-PA Metropolitan Statistical Area.

Geography
It has a humid continental climate (Dfa/Dfb) and average monthly temperatures in Sharon range from 27.1 °F in January to 72.2 °F in July, while in Mercer borough they range from 25.4 °F in January to 70.1 °F in July.

Adjacent counties
Crawford County (north)
Venango County (east)
Butler County (southeast)
Lawrence County (south)
Mahoning County, Ohio (southwest)
Trumbull County, Ohio (west)

Major highways

Demographics

As of the census of 2000, there were 120,293 people, 46,712 households, and 32,371 families residing in the county.  The population density was 179 people per square mile (69/km2).  There were 49,859 housing units at an average density of 74 per square mile (29/km2).  The racial makeup of the county was 93.13% White, 5.25% Black or African American, 0.11% Native American, 0.40% Asian, 0.02% Pacific Islander, 0.17% from other races, and 0.91% from two or more races.  0.67% of the population were Hispanic or Latino of any race. 37.7% were of German, 20.0% Irish, 14.9% Italian, 12.0% English, 6.4% American, 6.2% Polish, 3.7% Scotch-Irish, 3.3% Dutch ancestry.

There were 46,712 households, out of which 29.30% had children under the age of 18 living with them, 54.80% were married couples living together, 10.90% had a female householder with no husband present, and 30.70% were non-families. 27.00% of all households were made up of individuals, and 13.20% had someone living alone who was 65 years of age or older.  The average household size was 2.44 and the average family size was 2.96.

In the county, the population was spread out, with 23.40% under the age of 18, 8.90% from 18 to 24, 26.10% from 25 to 44, 23.50% from 45 to 64, and 18.10% who were 65 years of age or older.  The median age was 40 years. For every 100 females there were 94.70 males.  For every 100 females age 18 and over, there were 90.80 males.

2020 Census

Government and politics

|}

Voter Registration
As of November 7, 2022, there are 72,325 registered voters in the county. Republicans hold a plurality of voters by a margin of 9,387 voters (13% of the total registered). There are 35,980 registered Republicans, 26,593 registered Democrats, 7,551 registered non-affiliated voters, and 2,201 voters registered to third parties.

Political bellwether
Mercer County was previously considered a political bellwether for the state of Pennsylvania since its demographics, urban/rural ratio, and party affiliation once closely mirrored the state as a whole.  In 2000, Al Gore carried it against George W. Bush. This trend failed to hold true during 2004 Presidential election and 2008 Presidential election, in which Mercer County voted more conservatively than the rest of the state.  In 2004, George W. Bush won Mercer County with 51% of the vote. That year John Kerry won the state as a whole with 51% of the popular vote. In 2008, John McCain won Mercer County by fewer than 200 votes, as he and Barack Obama each received roughly 49% of the popular vote. Barack Obama won the state of Pennsylvania as a whole with 55% of the popular vote. Each of the three statewide office winners also carried Mercer in 2008. In 2016, Donald Trump won Mercer County by 12,403 votes. Trump also won the state of Pennsylvania. Each of the three Republican candidates for statewide office carried Mercer County in 2016. In 2020, Trump again carried the county, despite Pennsylvania narrowly voting for Joe Biden. Trump carried 62% of the vote, the largest majority for any major party candidate since 1964, and the largest majority for a Republican since 1928.

County Officials

State Senate

State House of Representatives

United States House of Representatives

United States Senate

Education

Higher education
 Grove City College (Grove City)
 Thiel College (Greenville)
 Pennsylvania State University, Shenango Campus (Sharon)
 Butler County Community College, BC3 @ Linden Pointe (Hermitage)

Career-based education
 Laurel Technical Institute, Sharon
 Mercer County Career and Technical Center, Mercer
 Penn State Cosmetology Academy, Hermitage
 Sharon Regional Health System Schools of Nursing and Radiology, Sharon

Public school districts

 Crawford Central School District
 Commodore Perry School District
 Farrell Area School District
 Greenville Area School District
 Grove City Area School District
 Hermitage School District
 Jamestown Area School District
 Lakeview School District
 Mercer Area School District
 Reynolds School District
 Sharon City School District
 Sharpsville Area School District
 West Middlesex Area School District
 Wilmington Area School District

Charter schools
Keystone Education Center Charter School, Greenville, PA. 256 pupils grades 7-12 Report Card 2010.

Private schools
 Kennedy Catholic High School, Hermitage, PA.
 St Michael's Elementary School, Greenville, PA.

Recreation
There is one Pennsylvania state park in Mercer County. Maurice K. Goddard State Park, named for Maurice K. Goddard, former Secretary of the Pennsylvania Department of Environmental Resources, is just off exit 130 of Interstate 79 on Pennsylvania Route 358 near Stoneboro.

The Wendell August Forge, the last remaining working forge in the state, was open to the public for tours, but it burned down on March 6, 2010. It has since reopened in new facilities.

Mercer County Court House built in 1909.

Communities

Under Pennsylvania law, there are four types of incorporated municipalities: cities, boroughs, townships, and, in one case, towns. The following cities, boroughs and townships are located in Mercer County:

Cities
Farrell
Hermitage (largest city in Mercer County)
Sharon

Boroughs

Clark
Fredonia
Greenville
Grove City
Jackson Center
Jamestown
Mercer (county seat)
New Lebanon
Sandy Lake
Sharpsville
Sheakleyville
Stoneboro
West Middlesex
Wheatland

Townships

Coolspring
Deer Creek
Delaware
East Lackawannock
Fairview
Findley
French Creek
Greene
Hempfield
Jackson
Jefferson
Lackawannock
Lake
Liberty
Mill Creek
New Vernon
Otter Creek
Perry
Pine
Pymatuning
Salem
Sandy Creek
Sandy Lake
Shenango
South Pymatuning
Springfield
Sugar Grove
West Salem
Wilmington
Wolf Creek
Worth

Census-designated places
Lake Latonka
Reynolds Heights

Unincorporated communities
Blacktown
Carlton
Clarks Mills
Fairview (village)
Hadley
Kennard
Kremis
Milledgeville
New Vernon (village)
Osgood
Petersburg
Transfer
Williams Corners

Former community
Hickory Township-became the Municipality of Hermitage in 1976, and then the City of Hermitage in 1984.

Mixed Nomenclature 

 Borough of Greenville is also interchangeably designated as Town of Greenville with exact municipal designation currently unclear.

Population ranking
The population ranking of the following table is based on the 2010 census of Mercer County.

† county seat

See also
 National Register of Historic Places listings in Mercer County, Pennsylvania

References

External links
 Government - https://web.archive.org/web/20071006122227/http://www.mcc.co.mercer.pa.us/
 https://web.archive.org/web/20071007130714/http://www.mercercountypa.org/